Sonia Evans (born 13 February 1971), known mononymously as Sonia, is an English pop singer from Liverpool. She had a 1989 UK number one hit with "You'll Never Stop Me Loving You" and became the first female UK artist to achieve five top 20 hit singles from one album. She represented the United Kingdom in the 1993 Eurovision Song Contest, where she finished second with the song "Better the Devil You Know". Between 1989 and 1993, she had 11 UK top 30 hits, including "Listen to Your Heart" (1989), "Counting Every Minute" (1990) and "Only Fools (Never Fall in Love)" (1991). In 1994, she starred as Sandy in a West End revival of the musical Grease, while on television she appeared as Bunty in the 1998 BBC comedy series The Lily Savage Show.

Music career
Sonia was signed to Chrysalis Records after badgering Pete Waterman to listen to her sing outside his recording studio in Liverpool. Waterman called her bluff and asked her to sing live on his weekly radio show. Sonia's debut single, "You'll Never Stop Me Loving You", composed and produced by the songwriting and music production trio Mike Stock, Matt Aitken and Pete Waterman (Stock Aitken Waterman) was released in June 1989. "You'll Never Stop Me Loving You" peaked at number 1 on the UK Singles Chart for two weeks the following month. At 18, Sonia became one of the youngest female British singers to achieve this feat. The single also topped the Irish chart and reached the top 10 of the US dance chart.

Sonia's debut album, Everybody Knows, was released in April 1990. The album peaked at number 7 in the UK, and was certified gold by the British Phonographic Industry. All five singles released from the album became top 20 hits in the UK, making Sonia the first British solo female artist to achieve this. Sonia achieved a sixth top 20 hit in the UK in 1990 with "You've Got a Friend", recorded with the group Big Fun, and released as a charity single for Childline.

Sonia left her record label and released her second, self-titled album in 1991, produced by Nigel Wright. The first single released from it, "Only Fools (Never Fall in Love)" became Sonia's third UK top 10 hit, although the album was less successful than her debut.

Sonia also contributed to two charity singles, Band Aid II's "Do They Know It's Christmas?" in 1989 (peaked at number 1 in the UK) and Gulf Aid's "As Time Stood Still" in 1991.

In 1993, Sonia represented the United Kingdom in the 1993 Eurovision Song Contest, singing the Dean Collinson and Brian Teasdale composition "Better the Devil You Know". She was placed second in the contest. Her third album, also titled Better the Devil You Know was released that year and reached number 32 in the UK.

In 1994, Sonia replaced singer Debbie Gibson as Sandy in the West End musical Grease. A cover of "Hopelessly Devoted to You" was released as a tie-in single, but it only peaked at number 61 in the UK.

In 1995, Sonia released a cover of "Wake Up Everybody", which did not enter the UK top 100. It was to be the lead single of her fourth album, the soul covers album Love Train - The Philly Album, but Sonia was unhappy with it and it only received a promotional release.

Sonia performed a vocal part in Italian Eurobeat singer Nuage's "I'm Never Gonna Let You Down and Forget You", released in Japan in 2004, produced by Dave Rodgers.

Late 2007 saw the release of Sonia's Greatest Hits album. However, this compilation only featured recordings from Sonia's two albums released on BMG.

In 2007, prior to Sonia's Greatest Hits release, she recorded two Motown-influenced songs, "Dancing in the Driver's Seat" and "Your Heart or Mine", both of which were written by Barry Upton and U.S. songwriter Gordon Pogoda. However, her record label decided to include no new songs on Greatest Hits so both tracks remained unreleased until 2018.

In 2008, Sonia recorded a cover of the Beatles' "She Loves You" for the Liverpool – The Number Ones Album.

On 1 June 2009, Sonia released her first single in 14 years, "Fool for Love".

In October 2010, the Everybody Knows album was remastered and re-issued in expanded form, containing two additional tracks, extended versions of her first four singles, and a demo version of "You'll Never Stop Me Loving You". Also in 2010, Sonia's cover version of "You've Got a Friend", a duet with Big Fun, was released on a reissue of the group's debut album.

On 21 December 2012, Sonia performed at the Stock Aitken Waterman "Hit Factory Live" reunion concert at The O2 in London, along with many other former SAW acts, including Kylie Minogue.

In summer 2018, in conjunction with her appearance in the Channel 5 program Celebrity 5 Go Caravanning, Sonia's recording of "Dancing in the Driver's Seat", written by Barry Upton and Gordon Pogoda, was released. Another song recorded with Upton and Pogoda in 2007, "Your Heart or Mine", was released in 2018 as its follow-up.

Sonia signed a new record deal with Energise Records in 2019, and a new single, "A Night That's Never Ending", was released in November 2019.

Acting career and television work
Prior to her music career, around 1988, Evans appeared as an extra in Channel 4's soap opera Brookside, and also appeared in an episode of the BBC1 situation comedy Bread, where she played Ellia, a short-term girlfriend of Adrian Boswell, in episode 11 of series 4.

In 1990, Sonia co-hosted children's game show The Wetter the Better as a scoreboard person with main quizmaster Ross King, which was part of the Saturday morning children's magazine show 8:15 from Manchester.

In 1993, Sonia made her theatre debut in the musical Slice of Saturday Night, alongside Dennis Waterman. The following year she replaced singer Debbie Gibson as Sandy in a West End revival of Grease, where she stayed for a year. In 1997, she returned to the stage on the musical What A Feeling!, which also included fellow 1980s stars Luke Goss and Sinitta. An accompanying soundtrack album was released.

She has also played alongside Lily Savage as her wayward daughter Bunty Savage, both on the BBC series The Lily Savage Show and live shows.
Also in 1993, Sonia represented the UK in the Eurovision Song Contest. It was held in Millstreet, county Cork in Ireland. She sang "Better the Devil You Know" and finished second.

In 2003, Sonia appeared in the ITV1 reality show Reborn in the USA, where former pop stars including Leee John from the band Imagination, Michelle Gayle, Gina G, Elkie Brooks and pop duo Dollar performed American hits. The show saw the artists touring America and each week one artist was eliminated from the show. Sonia came sixth out of the nine participants.

In January 2007, she starred in the pantomime Jack and the Beanstalk as Jack in Horsham, West Sussex, alongside Mark Curry. Sonia also starred in the pantomime Cinderella in December 2010 / January 2011 as the Wicked Queen Edwina at the Stiwt Theatre in Wrexham, North Wales, alongside Big Brother star Dale Howard.

She appeared on series 5 of Hacker Time.

In 2018, Sonia appeared alongside Todd Carty, Tony Blackburn, Colin Baker and Sherrie Hewson in Channel 5's Celebrity 5 Go Caravanning.

Personal life
Sonia was born on 13 February 1971. She married Mark Moses in 1998 and the couple have a daughter, who was born in 2010.

Discography

Studio albums

Compilations

Singles

References

External links

1971 births
English dance musicians
Eurovision Song Contest entrants for the United Kingdom
Eurovision Song Contest entrants of 1993
Living people
Musicians from Liverpool
English women pop singers
21st-century English women singers
21st-century English singers